Dolgo-Makhovatka is a rural locality (a selo) in Novosilskoye Rural Settlement, Semiluksky District, Voronezh Oblast, Russia. The population was 69 as of 2010. There are 3 streets.

Geography 
Dolgo-Makhovatka is located on the right bank of the Olshanka River, 59 km northwest of Semiluki (the district's administrative centre) by road. Staraya Olshanka is the nearest rural locality.

References 

Rural localities in Semiluksky District